Kelli Evon Williams-Malcolm (born June 1978) is an American gospel musician. Her first album, Kelli Williams, was released by Sony Music Entertainment in 1995. The subsequent album, I Get Lifted, was released in 1998 by Word Records in association with Epic Records, and this was a Billboard magazine breakthrough release upon the Gospel Albums chart. She released, In the Myx, with the Word Records in tandem with Epic Records in 2000.

Early life
Williams-Malcolm was born as Kelli Evon Williams, in June 1978, to father, Eddie, and mother, Carolyn, in Nashville, Tennessee. She sang professionally at ten years old. In 1993, Williams-Malcolm appeared on Star Search, which she won.

Music career
Her music recording career commenced in 1995, with the album, Kelli Williams, and it was released by Sony Music Entertainment. The second album, I Get Lifted, was released on February 17, 1998 by Word Records and Epic Records, and this was her Billboard magazine breakthrough release upon the Gospel Albums chart at No. 35. She released, In the Myx, on July 4, 2000 with Word Records and Epic Records.

Personal life
Williams-Malcolm is married to Royce Edward Malcolm. They reside in Portland, Tennessee with their son, Bentley Edward Malcolm, who was born May 2003.

Discography

References

External links
 Cross Rhythms artist profile
 Crosswalk article

1978 births
Living people
African-American songwriters
African-American Christians
Musicians from Nashville, Tennessee
Songwriters from Tennessee
Epic Records artists
Word Records artists
People from Portland, Tennessee
21st-century African-American people
20th-century African-American people